Gaiters are garments worn on the legs.

Gaiter may refer to:

Gaiter (vehicle)
Crus (lower leg)
Bishop's Gaiters, sports teams at Bishop's University
Neck gaiter, a warming garment worn on the neck, which can be pulled up over the mouth to keep out wind and sand

People:
Dorothy Gaiter, wine columnist of The Wall Street Journal
Donovan Tracy Gaiter, joint chief executive officer of Outcast Studios

See also
 Gator (disambiguation)
 Gater (disambiguation)